The 3 cm MK 303 Flak and twin-mounted 3 cm MK 303 Flakzwilling (M44) were experimental 30 mm anti-aircraft guns developed in Nazi Germany. They fired the powerful 30x210mm round and only 222 were produced.  The gun was to be installed on Type XXI submarines as AA defense and its use as AA defense replacing 2 cm Flak and 3.7 cm Flak weapons was also considered. The use of 3 cm M.K. 303 Flakzwilling on Flakpanzer IV "Kugelblitz" was considered, but rejected.  The development began in late 1941 and production started in late 1944.

Post War Usage

In the 50s, the MK 303 was produced in Czechoslovakia under the designation M53, with the clip feed replaced by a 10-round box magazine. It was also used as armament of SPAAG M53/59 Praga.

References

30 mm artillery
Autocannon
Anti-aircraft guns of Germany
Naval guns of Germany
Naval anti-aircraft guns
World War II anti-aircraft guns
World War II artillery of Germany
Weapons and ammunition introduced in 1944